HMS Thisbe was a 28-gun  sixth-rate frigate of the Royal Navy.

Service

Thisbe was first commissioned in December 1787 under the command of Captain George Robertson. Because Thisbe served in the navy's Egyptian campaign (8 March to 2 September 1801), her officers and crew qualified for the clasp "Egypt" to the Naval General Service Medal that the Admiralty authorized in 1850 to all surviving claimants.

In 1804 Thisbe was in the Mediterranean. There she captured a privateer that she sent into Corfu. Thisbe also recaptured Wight, Ford, master, which had been sailing from Zant to London when the privater had captured her. '"Wight arrived at Portsmouth in September.

Notes, citations, and references

Notes

Citations

References
 Robert Gardiner, The First Frigates, Conway Maritime Press, London 1992. .
 David Lyon, The Sailing Navy List, Conway Maritime Press, London 1993. .
 Rif Winfield, British Warships in the Age of Sail, 1714 to 1792, Seaforth Publishing, London 2007. .

External links
 

1783 ships
Sixth-rate frigates of the Royal Navy
Ships built in Kent